Jeffrey Kent Eugenides (born March 8, 1960) is an American novelist and short story writer. He has written numerous short stories and essays, as well as three novels: The Virgin Suicides (1993), Middlesex (2002), and The Marriage Plot (2011). The Virgin Suicides served as the basis of a feature film, while Middlesex received the 2003 Pulitzer Prize for Fiction in addition to being a finalist for the National Book Critics Circle Award, the International Dublin Literary Award, and France's Prix Médicis.

Biography
Eugenides was born in Detroit, Michigan to a father of Greek descent and a mother of English and Irish ancestry. Eugenides is the youngest of three sons. He attended Grosse Pointe's private University Liggett School and then Brown University (where he became friends with contemporary Rick Moody). He graduated from Brown in 1982 after taking a year off to travel across Europe and volunteer with Mother Teresa in Calcutta, India. Of his decision to study at Brown, Eugenides remarked "I chose Brown largely in order to study with John Hawkes, whose work I admired. I entered the honors program in English, which forced me to study the entire English tradition, beginning with Beowulf. I felt that since I was going to try to add to the tradition, I had better know something about it." In 1986, he earned an M.A. in English and Creative Writing from Stanford University.

Eugenides knew he wanted to be a writer from a relatively early age, stating "I decided very early; during my junior year of high school. We read A Portrait of the Artist as a Young Man that year, and it had a big effect on me, for reasons that seem quite amusing to me now. I'm half Irish and half Greek—my mother's family were Kentuckians, Southern hillbillies, and my paternal grandparents immigrants from Asia Minor—and, for that reason, I identified with Stephen Dedalus. Like me, he was bookish, good at academics, and possessed an "absurd name, an ancient Greek." [...] I do remember thinking [...] that to be a writer was the best thing a person could be. It seemed to promise maximum alertness to life. It seemed holy to me, and almost religious." Of his earliest literary influences, Eugenides has cited "[...] the great modernists. Joyce, Proust, Faulkner. From these I went on to discover Musil, Woolf, and others, and soon my friends and I were reading Pynchon and John Barth. My generation grew up backward. We were weaned on experimental writing before ever reading much of the nineteenth-century literature the modernists and postmodernists were reacting against."

Eugenides was raised in Detroit, Michigan and cites the influence of the city and his high-school experiences on his writings. He has said that he has "a perverse love" of his birthplace. "I think most of the major elements of American history are exemplified in Detroit, from the triumph of the automobile and the assembly line to the blight of racism, not to mention the music, Motown, the MC5, house, techno." He also says he has been haunted by the decline of Detroit.

In 1986, he received the Academy of Motion Picture Arts and Sciences Nicholl Fellowship for his story "Here Comes Winston, Full of the Holy Spirit." After living a few years in San Francisco, he moved to Brooklyn, New York and worked as secretary for the Academy of American Poets. While in New York he made friends with numerous similarly struggling writers, including Jonathan Franzen.

From 1999 to 2004, Eugenides lived in Berlin, Germany, where he moved after being awarded a grant from the German Academic Exchange Service to write in Berlin for a year. Eugenides lived in Princeton, New Jersey, since the fall of 2007, when he joined the faculty of Princeton University's Program in Creative Writing.

Of teaching creative writing, Eugenides remarked in an interview with The Paris Review, "I tell my students that when you write, you should pretend you're writing the best letter you ever wrote to the smartest friend you have. That way, you'll never dumb things down. You won't have to explain things that don't need explaining. You'll assume an intimacy and a natural shorthand, which is good because readers are smart and don't wish to be condescended to. I think about the reader. I care about the reader. Not "audience." Not "readership." Just the reader."

In 2018, Eugenides joined New York University's Creative Writing Program as a tenured full professor and the Lewis and Loretta Glucksman Professor in American Letters.

Eugenides met his former wife, photographer and sculptor Karen Yamauchi, at the MacDowell artist's program. They got married in 1995 and later had a daughter named Georgia Eugenides.

Career

The Virgin Suicides

Eugenides' 1993 novel, The Virgin Suicides, has been translated into 34 languages. In 1999, the novel was adapted into a critically acclaimed film directed by Sofia Coppola. Set in Grosse Pointe, Michigan, the novel follows the lives and deaths by suicide of five sisters over the course of an increasingly isolated year, as told from the point of view of the neighborhood boys who obsessively watch them.

1996–2001
Eugenides published short stories in the nine years between The Virgin Suicides and Middlesex, primarily in The New Yorker. His 1996 story "Baster" became the basis for the 2010 romantic comedy The Switch, temporarily putting Middlesex aside in the late '90s to begin work on a novel that would eventually serve as the basis for his third. Two excerpts of what became Eugenides's work-in-progress third novel after Middlesex also appeared in The New Yorker in 2011, "Asleep in the Lord" and "Extreme Solitude." Eugenides also served as the editor of the collection of short stories titled My Mistress's Sparrow is Dead. The proceeds of the collection go to the writing center 826 Chicago, established to encourage young people's writing.

Middlesex

His 2002 novel, Middlesex, won the 2003 Pulitzer Prize for Fiction in addition to being a finalist for the National Book Critics Circle Award, the International Dublin Literary Award, and France's Prix Médicis. Following the life and self-discovery of Calliope Stephanides, or later, Cal, an intersex person raised a girl, but genetically a boy, Middlesex also broadly deals with the Greek-American immigrant experience in the United States, the rise and fall of Detroit, and explores the experience of an intersex person in the U.S.A.

The Marriage Plot

After a nine-year hiatus, Eugenides published his third novel, The Marriage Plot, in October 2011. The novel follows three young adults enmeshed in a love triangle, as they graduate from Brown University and establish themselves in the world. Eugenides is currently at work developing a television screenplay of the novel, which was a finalist of the National Book Critics Circle Award for fiction in 2011; a New York Times notable book for 2011; and one of the top books of the year according to lists made by Publishers Weekly, Kirkus Reviews, and The Telegraph.

Fresh Complaint and fourth novel
In 2017, Eugenides published Fresh Complaint, a collection of short stories written between 1988 and 2017. He described the work as "a very mixed bag of stories, quite different, not all arranged around a certain theme".

He has suggested that a fourth novel will be published at an unspecified future date: "I have an idea; I don't know if it's going to work. But it's going to be a larger canvas, many more characters than in [The Marriage Plot]. Again, I'm going to respond to a very small directive. It's going to be written, well, I'm not going to say — but I know how it's going to be written and what the structure's going to be, and it's going to be quite different than The Marriage Plot."

Awards and honors

1986 Nicholl Fellowships in Screenwriting (Academy of Motion Picture Arts and Sciences)
1991 Aga Khan Prize for Fiction for "The Virgin Suicides" [short story] (The Paris Review)
1993 Whiting Award
1994 Guggenheim Fellowship
1994 & 1996 MacDowell Fellowship
1995 Harold D. Vursell Memorial Award  (American Academy of Arts and Letters)
2000–2001 Berlin Prize Fellow (American Academy in Berlin)
2002 National Book Critics Circle Award finalist (for Middlesex)
2003 Pulitzer Prize for Fiction (for Middlesex)
2003 Welt-Literaturpreis
2004 International Dublin Literary Award shortlist (for Middlesex)
2011 Salon Book Award (for The Marriage Plot)
2011 New York Times 100 Notable Books of 2011 list (for The Marriage Plot)
2012 National Book Critics Circle Award finalist (for The Marriage Plot)
2013 International Dublin Literary Award longlist (for The Marriage Plot)
2013 Named a fellow of the American Academy of Arts and Sciences 
2013 Fitzgerald Prize (for "The Marriage Plot") - French prize rewards a novel, or a new French-language or translated in English reflecting the elegance, wit, style and taste of the lifestyle of the American writer F. Scott Fitzgerald.
 2014 Awarded honorary Doctorate of Letters from Brown University
 2018 Inducted into the American Academy of Arts and Letters

Works

Novels 

 The Virgin Suicides New York : Hachette Book Group, 1993. , 
 Middlesex New York, New York : Random House, 2002. ,  Pulitzer Prize for Fiction
 The Marriage Plot London : Fourth Estate, 2011. ,

Short story collections 

 Fresh Complaint New York : Farrar, Straus and Giroux, 2017. , . Contains 10 short stories:
 "Complainers" (2017)
 "Air Mail" (1996)
 "Baster" (The New Yorker, 1996)
 "Early Music" (The New Yorker, 2005)
 "Timeshare"
 "Find the Bad Guy" (The New Yorker, 2013)
 "The Oracular Vulva" (1999)
 "Capricious Gardens" (The Gettysburg Review, 1988)
 "Great Experiment" (The New Yorker, 2008)
 "Fresh Complaint" (2017)

Short stories 

Uncollected short stories.

  (Subscription Required)
 "A Genetic History of My Grandparents" (The New Yorker, 1997)
 "The Burning of Smyrna" (The New Yorker, 1998)
 "Ancient Myths" (The Spatial Uncanny, James Casebere, Sean Kelly Gallery, 2001)
 "The Obscure Object" (The New Yorker, 2002)
 "Extreme Solitude" (The New Yorker, 2010)
 "Asleep in the Lord" (The New Yorker, 2011)
 "Bronze" (The New Yorker, 2018)

References

External links

Jeffrey Eugenides, Princeton University Creative Writing Program
Articles by Jeffrey Eugenides on the 5th Estate blog
 Works by Jeffrey Eugenides on The New Yorker
"Great Experiment", The New Yorker, 31 March 2008
Read "Extreme Solitude" story in New Yorker

Profile at The Whiting Foundation
 2012 Whiting Writers' Award Keynote Speech 

Interviews
Video of Eugenides with Salman Rushdie, "LIVE", New York Public Library, June 27, 2008
Video of Eugenides with Daniel Kehlmann, PEN World Voices, May 4, 2008
Fresh Air, "Interview with Terry Gross", WHYY, aired on 2002-09-24

"Interview", 3am Magazine, 2003
Salon.com interview
"Interview", Guardian Unlimited Books
Editor & Author, Jonathan Galassi and Jeffrey Eugenides "Works in Progress", 21 July 2010
A Conversation with Jeffrey Eugenides "Oprah", 5 June 2007
Nine Years After Middlesex "Wall Street Journal", 30 September 2011
Interview: Jeffrey Eugenides on writing in C major "LA Times", 29 October 2011
Marriage, plot and Jeffrey Eugenides – 2012 Brisbane Writers Festival – (Interview and Q&A)  – Australian Broadcasting Corporation
Jeffrey Eugenides: The Excitement of Writing – 2012 Louisiana Literature festival – Video by Louisiana Channel.

1960 births
20th-century American essayists
20th-century American male writers
20th-century American non-fiction writers
20th-century American novelists
20th-century American short story writers
21st-century American essayists
21st-century American male writers
21st-century American non-fiction writers
21st-century American novelists
21st-century American short story writers
American historical novelists
American male essayists
American male non-fiction writers
American male novelists
American male short story writers
American people of English descent
American people of Irish descent
American satirists
American social commentators
American writers of Greek descent
American writers of Irish descent
Brown University alumni
Living people
Novelists from Michigan
Novelists from New Jersey
People from Detroit
Princeton University faculty
American psychological fiction writers
Pulitzer Prize for Fiction winners
Stanford University alumni
MacDowell Colony fellows
Surrealist writers
Writers about activism and social change
Writers from Detroit
Writers of historical fiction set in the modern age
Members of the American Academy of Arts and Letters